Glória de Sant'Anna (26 May 1925 – 2 June 2009) was a Portuguese-born poet and educator who lived in Portuguese Mozambique from 1951 to 1974.

She was born in Lisbon and taught school in Porto Amélia (later Pemba) and Vila Pery (later Chimoio). De Sant'Anna married architect Afonso Henriques Manta Andrade Paes in 1949. She published six collections of poetry while living in Mozambique and is credited with establishing a tradition of lyricism in Mozambique poetry. In 1961, she received the Prémio Camilo Pessanha for Livro de Água.

References 

1925 births
2009 deaths
Portuguese people in colonial Mozambique
20th-century Portuguese poets
Mozambican women poets
People from Lisbon
Portuguese women poets
20th-century Portuguese women writers